Hayk Harutyunyan (born 10 December 1974) is a retired Armenian football midfielder.

References

1974 births
Living people
Armenian footballers
FC Ararat Yerevan players
FC Kotayk Abovyan players
FC Solothurn players
FC Pyunik players
FC Mika players
Association football midfielders
Armenian expatriate footballers
Expatriate footballers in Switzerland
Armenian expatriate sportspeople in Switzerland
Armenia international footballers
Soviet Armenians
Soviet footballers